Peter Colston may refer to:

Peter Colston (ornithologist) (born 1935), English ornithologist
Peter Colston (rugby union) (died 2022), English rugby union player and coach